Ovandrotone, also known as androstenedione-7α-carboxyethylthioether, is a synthetic androstane steroid and the C7α carboxyethylthioether of androstenedione. It is a component of ovandrotone albumin (Fecundin), a conjugate of androstenedione and human serum albumin and an immunogen and vaccine against androstenedione that is used to generate androgen immunity and thereby increase the ovulation rate and number of lambs born to ewes.

References 

Androstanes
Diketones
Thioethers
Veterinary drugs
Sheep